Sylvia Fraser (born Sylvia Lois Meyers; 8 March 1935 – 25 October 2022) was a Canadian novelist, journalist and travel writer.  Fraser was educated at the University of Western Ontario.  In her long year career as a journalist, she has written hundreds of articles, beginning as a feature writer for the Toronto Star Weekly (1957–68), and continuing with articles for many other magazines and newspapers including The Globe and Mail, Saturday Night, Chatelaine, The Walrus and Toronto Life.  She taught creative writing for many years at Banff Centre and at various university workshops.  She has participated in extensive media tours, given lectures and readings throughout Canada, the United States, Britain and Sweden.  She served on the Arts Advisory Panel to the Canada Council and was a member of Canada Council's 1985 cultural delegation to China.  She was a founding member of the Writers' Union of Canada and for many years was on the executive of the Writers' Trust of Canada, a charitable organization for the support of Canadian authors and literature.  Fraser lived in Toronto, Ontario.

Early life and education 
Sylvia Lois Meyers was born in Hamilton, Ontario, the second daughter of George and Gladys Meyers. Her father, a former World War One officer, worked for the Steel Company of Canada and her mother was involved in church and community work. In 1957, she married Russell Fraser, a lawyer. After working for several years working as a journalist, she began writing novels after the magazine she wrote for went out of business.

Fraser was repeatedly sexually abused by her father from her early childhood to her late teens, which became a recurring topic in several of her fiction and non-fiction works, including Pandora, My Father's House, The Book of Strange, and The Ancestral Suitcase. However, she repressed these memories for most of her life, and did not remember them until she began writing about it in these works.

Career 
Fraser's first novel, Pandora, tells the story of a young girl who is sexually abused by the man who delivers bread to her house. It was highly regarded for its prose and launched Fraser's career in Canadian Literature.

In 1983, while lunching with friends Ms. Fraser suddenly and clearly remembered the abuse she had suffered from her father. Afterward, she divested her possessions and moved to California where she spent the next two years writing the book that helped deal with the pain and trauma of the abuse. The resulting memoir, My Father's House (1987), recounts  the sexual abuse committed to her by her father throughout her childhood. The book had multiple hardcover and paperback printings and was translated into eight languages. It won the Canadian Authors Association Literary Award for non-fiction. Scholars have asserted that it sets an exemplary model of the process of surviving trauma.

Her subsequent books, The Book of Strange (1992, since republished as The Quest for the Fourth Monkey) and The Ancestral Suitcase (1996) deal with nonlinear time, reincarnation, and memory.

In addition to her books, Fraser taught creative writing at the Banff Centre for the Arts and wrote profiles for Toronto Life and other magazines. She also ghostwrote memoirs, including Unsinkable (2014), for Olympic rower Silken Laumann, and Open Heart, Open Mind (2015) for Olympic cyclist and speed skater Clara Hughes.

Bibliography
Pandora - 1972
The Candy Factory - 1975
A Casual Affair - 1978
The Emperor's Virgin - 1980
Berlin Solstice - 1984
My Father's House - 1987
The Book of Strange - 1992
The Ancestral Suitcase - 1996
The Rope in the Water: A Pilgrimage to India - 2001
The Green Labyrinth: Exploring the Mysteries of the Amazon - 2003

CHILDREN'S FICTION:  Tom & Francine (1998). 
EDITOR:  A Woman's Place: seventy years in the lives of Canadian Women 	(1997).

Awards and honours 
Women's Press Club, 1967 and 1968.

President's Medal, for Canadian journalism, 1968.

Canadian Authors' Association Non-Fiction Book Award, 1987 for My  Father's House.

Feminist Book Fortnight Selection, U.K., 1987. My Father's House.

American Library Association Booklist Medal,1994, for The Quest for the Fourth Monkey.

National Magazine Gold Medal, 1994, 2004, 2005.

National Magazine Silver Medal, 1996 & 2002.

Western Magazine Gold Medal, 2006.

Phoenix Women Rising Award, 2007 inaugural, Sexual Abuse Centre, London.

The Matt Cohen A Writer's Life Award for lifetime literary achievement.

External links
Sylvia Fraser Archive at McMaster University

References

1935 births
Living people
Canadian women novelists
Writers from Hamilton, Ontario
Writers from Toronto
20th-century Canadian novelists
20th-century Canadian women writers